Statistics of Allsvenskan in season 1981.

Overview
The league was contested by 14 teams, with Östers IF winning the championship.

League table

Results

Relegation play-offs

Elfsborg won 2–1 on aggregate.
Kalmar FF won 4–2 on aggregate.

Footnotes

References 

Allsvenskan seasons
Swed
Swed
1